Waita Setu (born 5 February 1992) is a New Zealand-born Australian rugby union loose forward who currently plays for  in Australia's National Rugby Championship.   He has also previously represented Super Rugby side, the Queensland Reds.

Early and provincial career

Setu was born in Auckland, New Zealand but moved to Australia as a child and attended the prestigious St Joseph's College, Nudgee in Brisbane.   During this time he represented Queensland at Under 16 and schools levels.   His early career was a nomadic one, with spells in the youth systems of Australian rugby league sides, the Brisbane Broncos and Melbourne Storm preceding a move across the Tasman Sea to New Zealand in 2014 where he linked up with union side  although he didn't manage any senior appearances.  He was back in Australia in 2015 and played Queensland Premier Rugby with GPS, scoring 7 tries in his debut season and earning a call up to 's National Rugby Championship winning squad.

Super Rugby career

Setu was a member of the Melbourne Rebels wider training squad in 2015, but did not see any action.   An injury to flanker Liam Gill gave Setu his Super Rugby break in 2016, he earned 3 Reds caps in total, 2 of which were from the start.

International

Setu was an Australian Schoolboys representative in 2012.

Super Rugby statistics

References

1992 births
Living people
Australian rugby union players
Rugby union flankers
Rugby union number eights
Brisbane City (rugby union) players
Queensland Reds players
New Zealand emigrants to Australia
Rugby union players from Auckland